Nicola Paula Cayco Curato, also known as "Nicole Curato", is a Filipina sociologist best known for her academic work on deliberative democracy, and her media work providing academic commentary on politics in the Philippines.

Early life and education 
She took her bachelor's degree of Sociology at University of the Philippines Diliman, and her Master's and Doctoral Degrees in Sociology in the United Kingdom – the former at the University of Manchester, and the latter at the University of Birmingham.

Academic work 
Curato is the recipient of Discovery Early Career Research Award Fellowship at the Centre for Deliberative Democracy and Global Governance at the University of Canberra. The award is funded by the Australian Research Council (ARC).

She joined the Centre as a post-doctoral research fellow at the Australian National University in 2011 where she worked on an ARC linkage project on the Australian Citizens' Parliament with John Dryzek and Simon Niemeyer. Before moving to Australia, she was an Assistant Professor of Sociology at the University of the Philippines-Diliman.

Her work has been published in academic journals including Qualitative Inquiry, Policy Sciences, Current Sociology, European Political Science Review and Acta Politica, among others. Her recent work has examined the character of Rodrigo Duterte's populism.

She also served as editor for several Special Issues of the Philippine Sociological Review.

Political commentary 
In the Philippines, Curato is best known as a go-to analyst for television and web coverage of political affairs in the Philippines. Among her more prominent appearances include her stint as post-debate panellist at the Manila/Vice-Presidential leg of the COMELEC-led PiliPinas Debates 2016, and her regular commentary for Rappler, CNN Philippines and Filipino Freethinkers.

In 2013, she was awarded as one of the Philippines' Ten Outstanding Young Men/People for the field of sociology.

See also 
 Patricia Evangelista

References 

Filipino sociologists
Filipino journalists
Living people
Filipino political commentators
Academic staff of the University of the Philippines
Alumni of the University of Birmingham
Alumni of the University of Manchester
University of the Philippines Diliman alumni
Filipino women journalists
Year of birth missing (living people)
Filipino political scientists
Women political scientists